The Blue Line (formerly known as the Moreland Line and the Van Aken Line) is a light rail line of the RTA Rapid Transit system in Cleveland and Shaker Heights, Ohio, running from Tower City Center downtown, then east and southeast to Warrensville Center Blvd near Chagrin Blvd.  of track, including two stations (Tri-C–Campus District and East 55th), are shared with the rapid transit Red Line, the stations have low platforms for the Blue Line and high platforms for the Red Line. The Blue Line shares the right-of-way with the Green Line in Cleveland, and splits off after passing through Shaker Square. All RTA light rail lines use overhead lines and pantographs to draw power.

Interurban portion 
From Tower City to just east of East 55th Street, the Blue and Green Lines share track with the Red Line for 2.6 miles (4.2 km) along a private right-of-way originally acquired in 1930 to bring intercity trains into Cleveland Union Terminal (the site of today's Tower City Center). The Tri-C–Campus District station and the East 55th station are shared by the heavy rail rapid transit Red Line and the light rail Blue and Green Lines on the same platform, an arrangement unique in North American rail transit. The shared stations have low platforms for the Blue and Green Lines directly adjacent to high platforms for the Red Line. RTA Central Rail yards and headquarters are located at the East 55th station, where trains of all rail lines are stored and serviced.

East of East 55th, the Blue and Green Lines split from the Red Line and travel east on a separate, dedicated, grade-separated right-of-way. A complex of tunnels existed at this junction to provide means for the Blue and Green Line trains to switch from right to left side running from East 55th to Tower City, but right side running is now used throughout the system, and the tunnels have been closed.

The private right of way extends from this junction to Woodhill Road at the western end of Shaker Boulevard and then below grade through an excavated cut in the median of Shaker Boulevard to Shaker Square. Along this portion of the lines are East 79th station, Woodhill station and East 116th Station. The lines then rise to street level at Shaker Square.

Suburban portion 

From Shaker Square eastward, both lines enter Shaker Heights and operate at street level with grade crossings, reflecting this portion of the lines' history as streetcar lines. Van Aken Boulevard branches off from Shaker Boulevard at this point and follows the Blue Line. The station-stops east of Shaker Square are adjacent to street intersections and consist mostly of concrete platforms with bus shelters. The Blue Line descends at Lee Road; an excavated cut under a bridge carrying Lee Road over the tracks. The line terminates at Warrensville Road and Van Aken Boulevard.

Designations 
When the Shaker Rapid merged into the RTA, The Blue line took the designation of 67. This was later changed to 67X. This remained with the opening of the Waterfront "line" extension of the Blue and Green lines. In the mid 2010s, the Waterfront line became a separate designation from the 67 and 67A Blue and Green lines. The Waterfront line was briefly designated as 67W. The three routes have united under the 67 designation, which is now internal and no longer shown on official timetables.

History

The Blue Line is the direct, continuously operating descendant of the privately-owned Cleveland Interurban Railroad and later the municipally owned Shaker Heights Rapid Transit, it connected the streetcar suburb of Shaker Heights to downtown Cleveland. This line and the Green Line were the only ones to survive the bustitution of Cleveland's transit system, partly due to their use of grade-separated trackage to across much of the east side of Cleveland.

Cleveland & Youngstown Railroad

As construction progressed on what is now known as the Green Line in Shaker Heights, the Van Sweringens realized that the connection to the Cleveland Railway's streetcar system through Cleveland Heights resulted in a slow trip to downtown. They planned for a grade-separated right-of-way all the way to downtown that could significantly reduce travel times for commuters, and thus increase the desirability of their suburb. In 1915 they acquired a majority interest in the New York, Chicago and St. Louis Railroad (the Nickel Plate Road), mainly to allow for a line next to a relocated NYC&StL.

Cleveland Interurban Railroad 
The Van Sweringens rapid line officially opened on April 11, 1920, running west from Lynnfield Road, down the median of Moreland (later renamed Van Aken) Boulevard, turning northwest and merging with Shaker Boulevard. It continued down the median of the new Shaker Boulevard to Woodhill Road, then across the Cleveland Short Line Railway (New York Central Railroad) and alongside a CSL branch to East 55th Street. West of East 55th Street, where the CSL branch crossed over the parallel Nickel Plate, the new streetcar line also crossed the Nickel Plate, continuing west between the branch and Nickel Plate, then up a ramp to the intersection of the Kingsbury Viaduct (East 34th Street) and Broadway. From there, the CIRR cars traveled along the tracks of Cleveland Railway's Broadway line, using street-running for the remainder of the trip downtown. 

Initially, the Shaker Line and the Vans' Rapid operated independently of each other. A connection was made between Coventry and the junction of Shaker and (Van Aken) on August 16, 1920. This change allowed through service on the main line from East 34th to Courtland, and eventually made the old line through Cleveland Heights redundant. In 1928, the Shaker Boulevard line was extended east from Courtland Boulevard to Warrensville Center Road.

As the Van Sweringens' railroad plans grew, they constructed a new Union Terminal for Cleveland. Cleveland Union Terminal (CUT) opened in 1930, along with a new grade-separated right-of-way with side-by-side lines for steam railroads and interurban streetcars, including the CIRR. Although their plans for another interurban line never materialized (the right-of-way was later used for the Red Line), the CIRR immediately began operations via the new right-of-way into the north part of CUT specially reserved for interurban train service. The CIRR no longer needed to run on city streetcar tracks and the ramp to Broadway and East 34th Street was removed. The first CIRR trains rolled into CUT on July 20. On the same day, the line was extended to its present terminus at Warrensville Road.

Shaker Heights Rapid Transit
On September 6, 1944, the City of Shaker Heights took over the financially struggling line and began operating it as a part of the Shaker Heights Rapid Transit. The city lacked funds for major line extensions. However, it did modernize the fleet with the purchase of PCC cars beginning in 1947.

In 1955 the Cleveland Transit System (which was formed in 1942 when the City of Cleveland took over the Cleveland Railway Company) opened the first section of the city's new rapid transit line, now known as the Red Line. The first section of the CTS rapid transit east from Cleveland Union Terminal included  and two stations shared with the Shaker Heights Rapid Transit line, necessitating split platforms with low-level sections (for Shaker Heights rapid transit cars) and high-level sections (for CTS rapid transit cars).

Greater Cleveland Regional Transit Authority

By the 1970s the City of Shaker Heights was struggling to maintain the Shaker Heights Rapid Transit and in Cleveland, CTS was facing financial problems with its rapid transit and bus system. Significant federal money was available, but only if a regional transit system was formed. In 1974, the Greater Cleveland Regional Transit Authority (RTA) was organized to take over the municipal transit system in Cleveland and others throughout Cuyahoga County. Voters approved a county-wide sales tax increase to help subsidize the transit system and RTA officially took over the Shaker Heights Rapid Transit lines on July 14, 1975. On September 30, 1979, RTA adopted a new designation for the rapid transit lines. The Airport-Windermere Line became the Red Line, while the Shaker Rapid Transit lines (Shaker and Van Aken) became the Green and Blue Lines.

In 1981, RTA undertook a complete renovation of the Blue Line, with new track, ballast, poles and overhead wiring. Existing station shelters were demolished and new shelters were constructed. The project necessitated closing the Blue Line east of Shaker Square for most of the summer of 1981, with substitute bus shuttles and single-tracking along the remainder of the line from East 55th Street to Shaker Square. To run on the renovated line, a fleet of new LRVs were purchased from an Italian firm, Breda Costruzioni Ferroviarie, to replace the aging PCC cars. The new line was dedicated on October 30, 1981.

Schedule
Blue and Green Line trains operate from approximately 3:40 a.m. to 1:00 a.m. daily. Each line operates every 30 minutes on weekdays and weekends, with service between Tower City and Shaker Square every 15 minutes. Waterfront Line service, before its suspension, was run by Blue Line trains from 7:00 a.m. to 7:00 p.m. on weekdays, and 9:30 a.m. to 7:00 p.m on weekends.

Rail Replacement Bus
During rail shutdowns, RTA uses the replacement bus designation "67R". Blue Line shuttle buses run between Tower City and Warrensville.

Rolling stock

The Blue and Green Lines use a fleet of 48 light rail vehicles (LRVs) manufactured by Breda Costruzioni Ferroviarie in 1980 and 1981. The units are numbered 801–848. RTA needs 34 of the cars for regular use, and requires only 17 to operate currently scheduled service.

The cars originally had white exteriors with broad orange and red stripes, and an interior finished in earth tones with faux wood paneling and orange and brown vinyl padded seats. With the opening of the Waterfront Line in 1996, RTA renovated five cars with blue and white exteriors, gray interiors with new gray and blue fabric-covered seats, and portraits of famous Clevelanders.

Around 2005, RTA renovated up to 34 cars with the hope of making them last for another 15 years. The renovated cars have silver exteriors with blue and red stripes, and gray and silver interiors with blue and red seats.

The Breda LRV cars replaced a fleet of PCC cars, some built for the Shaker Rapid Transit in 1947 and some purchased in 1953 and 1959.

Stations

References

External links

Routes - Greater Cleveland Regional Transit Authority - Rail
Jon Bell - Cleveland, Ohio: Green and Blue Lines
Northern Ohio Railway Museum

 
Light rail in Ohio
Standard gauge railways in the United States
600 V DC railway electrification
Railway lines opened in 1920
1920 establishments in Ohio